The AEC Militant (or "Milly") was a post-war development by AEC of the AEC Matador artillery tractor used during World War II. Externally the most noticeable development was the cab, which was considerably enlarged. Unlike the Matador only six-wheel versions were produced. Four-wheel versions are extant, but they are probably conversions and one is a Matador with a Mk1 Militant cab. Other changes included the fitting of a larger, 11.3-litre 6-cylinder, diesel engine and the use of a steel frame for the cab, rather than the ash (fraxinus) wood frame of the Matador. The Militant Mark 1 was produced in 6x4 (6 wheels, 4 driven) and 6x6 form (6 wheels, 6 driven).

Variants
Although primarily intended as a replacement for the Matador artillery tractor, other variants included an articulated lorry tractor unit, a General Service or cargo lorry with a longer wheelbase and as a chassis for mounting various cranes, usually supplied by Coles.

Service and civilian life
The Militant served with the British Army and some other armies in most parts of the world. It was intended as an improved artillery tractor, but after the Second World War, the development of large artillery pieces was gradually dropped in favour of more effective rockets and missiles, making this role largely redundant during the Militant's service life. Crews had mixed views of the Militant.  Because it had no power steering, it took considerable effort to turn the steering wheel at slow speeds and in difficult conditions. However, it was credited with a good cross-country performance and was often used to recover the six-wheel drive Alvis Stalwart amphibious lorries that bogged in difficult conditions. (The MkIII did have a power assist Steering Ram).

Most variants were fitted with a chassis-mounted winch that was driven through the gearbox. This winch, which was intended for manoeuvering of the towed field gun and for self-recovery of the vehicle, proved extremely strong and reliable. The Militant gained the nickname 'Knocker' from its military crews which may have been due to the rhythmic sound of the slow-revving engines.

The Knocker was the nickname of the MkI and the one MkI CALM was still in service with each RCT Transport Squadron until the AEC fleet was replaced by the Bedford 14 Tonne 6X6 in the early 90s.  AEC MkIII Recovery Trucks were replaced by Foden GS Recovery 6X6.

Many Militants were sold off by the Army in the 1970s and were purchased as heavy recovery vehicles or for forestry use by civilian operators. They were not as popular for forestry operations as their predecessor the Matador because the extra length and an extra axle made them less manoeuvrable in confined spaces. However, some users simply shortened the chassis and removed one axle, effectively creating a more powerful version of the Matador.

AEC MK1 Militants were still in service as late as 1985; the MK3s were still in service as late as 1990.

Gallery

See also
 Armoured recovery vehicle

References

Militant
British Army equipment
Military trucks of the United Kingdom
Artillery tractors
Off-road vehicles
World War II vehicles of the United Kingdom
Soft-skinned vehicles
Military vehicles introduced in the 1950s